Mary Brannagan (also Mai Brannagan) is an Irish chess player, Irish Women's Chess Championship two-times silver medalist (1968, 1973).

Biography
In the 1960s and 1970s, Mary Brannagan was one of Ireland's leading female chess players. She won in Irish Women's Chess Championships two silver medals: 1968, and 1973 (both times after winner Dorren O'Siochrú).

Mary Brannagan played for Ireland in the Women's Chess Olympiad:
 In 1969, at first board in the 4th Chess Olympiad (women) in Lublin (+0, =2, -7).

Mary Brannagan was a former president of the Leinster Chess Union and the Branagan Cup is named after her. She was Secretary (1963-1968) and President (1973-1974) of Rathmines Chess Club.

References

Year of birth missing (living people)
Living people
Irish female chess players
Chess Olympiad competitors
20th-century chess players